Crookedwood is a small village in County Westmeath on the R394 regional road. Historically it was called Taghmon, after the townland it occupies.

Geography
Overlooked by the dominating hill of Knockeyon to the north, the village rests between the pine-covered hills as  they roll down towards Lough Derravaragh, and located about 8 km north of Mullingar, at the south-eastern tip of the Lough.

Similar to Lough Lene, in Collinstown, the nearby Lough Derravaragh fishing interests are also promoted by the Crookedwood community.

Transport
Bus Éireann route 447 provides a link to Mullingar on Thursdays only.
The nearest rail service can be accessed at Mullingar railway station approximately 11km distant.

Sport
The local hurling club, Crookedwood G.A.A, play in the Senior B division of the Westmeath hurling championship.

See also 
 List of towns in the Republic of Ireland

References 

Towns and villages in County Westmeath
Articles on towns and villages in Ireland possibly missing Irish place names